Brachychiton compactus is a tree of the genus Brachychiton found in northeastern Australia. It is only found in the vicinity of Proserpine in Central Queensland.

Notes

References

compactus
Flora of Queensland
Malvales of Australia
Trees of Australia
Ornamental trees
Drought-tolerant trees